Qazax District is one of the 66 districts of Azerbaijan. It is located in the north-west of the country and belongs to the Gazakh-Tovuz Economic Region. The district borders the district of Aghstafa, and the Tavush Province of Armenia. Its capital and largest city is Gazakh. As of 2020, the district had a population of 98,400.

It has two exclaves inside Armenia, which include the villages of Yukhari Askipara, Barkhudarly, Sofulu. Both of the exclaves and parts of mainland Qazax District (the villages of Baghanis Ayrum, Ashaghi Eskipara, Gyzylhajily, and Kheyrimli) were captured by Armenian forces during the First Nagorno-Karabakh war.

History 

The region was conquered by a succession of neighboring powers or invaders, including Sassanid Persians, the Byzantine Empire, the Arabs, the Seljuq Turks, the Georgians, the Mongols, the Timurids, the Qara Qoyunlu and Aq Qoyunlu Turkoman tribes, and finally Safavid Iran. It was also ruled by Ottoman Empire between 1578 and 1607 and again 1722 and 1735.

By the end of the XV century, the Kazakh Sultanate was established as a sovereign geopolitical entity in the region. Though it was part of the Karabakh principality during the Safavid Empire, Sultan Shamsaddin of Gazakh was given the rank of Khan by the decree of Abbas the Great in 1605.

After the Russo-Persian War (1804-1813), the Russian Empire gained control of the area by virtue of the Treaty of Gulistan.  Under Russian rule, it was part of Tiflis Governorate before forming the northeastern part of the Kazakh Uyezd of the Elisabethpol Governorate in 1868.  A contemporary military historian noted the following ethnographic detail: "Abbas Mirza's route lay through the country of the great tribe of the Casaks, which is extremely strong and thickly wooded." He further notes that: "These have no connection with the Russian Cossacks. They are descended from men of the Kirgis Casaks, left by Genghis Khan. They are frequently called Karapapakh, from wearing black sheep-skin caps."

When the South Caucasus came under British occupation, Sir John Oliver Wardrop, British Chief Commissioner in the South Caucasus, decided that assigning the Erivan Governorate and the Kars Oblast to Democratic Republic of Armenia (DRA) and the Elisabethpol and Baku Governorates to the Azerbaijan Democratic Republic (ADR) would solve the region's outstanding disputes. However, this proposal was rejected by both Armenians (who did not wish to give up their claims to Gazakh, Zangezur (today Syunik), and Nagorno-Karabakh) and Azerbaijanis (who did not wish to give up their claims to Nakhchivan). As conflict broke out between the two groups, the British left the region in mid-1919.

Population

Nagorno-Karabakh conflict 
During the First Nagorno-Karabakh War, Armenian troops took control of several villages of the Gazakh District. Several Azerbaijani inhabitants were killed during the war although some of them were able to flee.

In July 2020, Gazakh became a site for clashes with Armenia.

List of historic and tourist sites 
There are 112 protected monuments in the region of Gazakh, of which 54 are archaeological, 46 are architectural, 7 are historical, and 5 are of artistic significance. Historic and tourist sites in this region include:

 The House of the Poet Samad Vurgun in Yukhari Salahli village, since 1976.
 The Museum of History and Ethnography, since 1984.
 The Gazakh State Picture Gallery by the Ministry of Culture of Azerbaijan, since 1986.
 The Memorial museum of Molla Panah Vagif and Molla Vali Vidadi, since 1970.
 The House of Teachers Seminary of Gazakh, built in 1910, functioned between 1918 and 1959.
 The Bath House of Israfil Agha, built in the first decade of the 20th century by Israfil Agha Kerbelayev from the village of Kasaman.
 The Damjili Caves, in the village of Dash Salahli, south-east of the mount Avey, cover an area of 360 km2 and refer to Middle and Upper Paleolithic, Mesolithic and Neolithic eras.
 Sining Korpu (The Broken Bridge), a 12th-century bridge built over the Ehram (Khram) river in the village Ikinji Shikhli.
 Didevan Castle, a 6th-7th century monument in the village of Khanliglar.
 Mount Goyazan, a rare archaeological monument in the village of Abbasbeyli, rises 857.9 metres above sea level.
 The Baba Dervish Habitation, an archaeological site in the village Demirchiler.
 The Kazim Bridge in the village of Yukhari Askipara, allegedly built during the reign of Shamsi Khan.
 The Juma Mosque of Qazakh, built in 1902 by Akhund Haji Zeynalabdin Mahammadli oghlu from the village of Kasaman.
 The Aslanbeyli Mosque built in 1909 by Hamid Efendi, the native of village Aslanbeyli.
 Santepe, an archaeological site dating to the 9th-8th centuries B.C. and the Iron Age.
 The Gazakhbeyli Hills, an archaeological site dating from the 8th-6th centuries B.C. near the village of Gazakhbeyli.
 The Shikhli Human Camp, an archaeological site near the village of Birinji Shikhli.
 Shakargala, in the Gazakh region.

Prominent people from Gazakh 

Sabir Azeri (1938-2010) - Writer, author of best-selling books. 
Aliagha Shikhlinski - (1865–1943) general-lieutenant of the artillery, known as "God of Russian artillery".
Farrukh Gayibov - (1889–1916) the first Azerbaijani pilot, was awarded the 4th class order of "Saint Georgi".
Ibrahim agha Vekilov - (1853–1934) general, the first Azerbaijani military topographer.
Javad bey Shikhlinski - (1876–1940) general-mayor, the commander of the division.
Ibrahim bey Usubov - (1872–1920) general-mayor, the commander of the division.
Mirza Huseyn Afandi Qayibov - (1830–1917) the Chair of the Ecclesiastical Department of Transcaucasia.
Molla Vali Vidadi - (1707–1809) prominent poet of Azerbaijan.
Molla Panah Vagif - (1717–1797) prominent poet of Azerbaijan and social figure.
Mukhtar Hajiyev - (1876–1938) the first chairman of Azerbaijan Central Executive Committee in 1921
Samad Vurgun - (1906–1956) National Poet of Azerbaijan (the first who deserved this title)
Vidadi Babanli - (1927-) National Writer of Azerbaijan
Osman Sarivelli - (1905–1990) national poet of Azerbaijan.
Mehdi Huseyn - (1909–1964) National Writer of Azerbaijan. Prominent writer-dramatist, critic.
Mirvarid Dilbazi - (1912–2001) national poet of Azerbaijan
Amina Dilbazi - (1919–2010) ballet-master. National Artist of Azerbaijan.
Elazan Bayjan (Haji Hasanzadeh) - (1913–1989) poet-doctor. Set up private medical clinics in Freyburg, Germany.
Ismayil Shykhly - (1919–1995) National Writer of Azerbaijan, scientist- pedagogue, social-political figure.
Elmira Huseynova - (1933–1995) sculptor.
Fatma Vekilova - (1912–1987) professor, doctor of geology-mineralogy sciences.
Sayad Zeynalov - (1886–1942) deserved 4th class "Saint Georgi" order
Teymur Bunyadov - (1928) academician, historian-ethnographer.
Tahir Isayev, a.k.a. Serafino - (1922–2001)
Ali Mustafayev - (1952–1991) National Hero of Azerbaijan.

References

External links 
 Official website of Gazakh District

Qazax District
Districts of Azerbaijan